Lucan is the common English name of the Roman poet Marcus Annaeus Lucanus.

Lucan may also refer to:

People
Arthur Lucan (born Arthur Towle), English actor
Sir Lucan the Butler, Knight of the Round Table in Arthurian legend
Vladimír Lučan, Czech orienteering competitor

Earl of Lucan
Earl of Lucan, a British peerage title

Earls of Lucan, first creation (1691)
Patrick Sarsfield, 1st Earl of Lucan
James Sarsfield, 2nd Earl of Lucan

Earls of Lucan, second creation (1795)
Charles Bingham, 1st Earl of Lucan 
Richard Bingham, 2nd Earl of Lucan 
George Bingham, 3rd Earl of Lucan, Cavalry commander in the Crimea, 185455.
Charles Bingham, 4th Earl of Lucan
George Bingham, 5th Earl of Lucan
George Bingham, 6th Earl of Lucan
Richard Bingham, 7th Earl of Lucan, the famous 'Lord Lucan' who mysteriously disappeared in 1974
George Bingham, 8th Earl of Lucan, who inherited the title when his father was declared dead in 2016

Places
Lucan, Dublin, Ireland, a suburb of Dublin
Lucan, Minnesota, a town in the United States
Lucan Biddulph, Ontario, a town in Canada
Lucan Airport
Lucan Irish, a junior ice hockey team
Lucan-Ilderton Jets, a senior ice hockey team

Other uses
 Lucan (American TV series), 1977–1978 drama about a man who as child was raised by wolves, based on the 1977 made-for-TV movie of the same name
 Lucan (British TV series), a 2013 television movie about the murder of Sandra Rivett and the disappearance of Lord Lucan
 San Lucan, a demonym referring to Cabo San Lucas, Baja California, Mexico
 San Lucan xeric scrub, a region of the Baja California peninsula
 San Lucan skink (Eumeces lagunensis), a species of lizard native to the Baja California peninsula
 San Lucan diamond rattlesnake
 San Lucan gecko

See also
 Lucani (disambiguation)